The Caprice 15 is a Canadian sailboat, that was designed by Cuthbertson & Cassian as a racer and first built in 1968.

Production
The boat was built by Canadian Sailcraft in Canada, starting in 1968, but is now out of production.

Design
The Caprice 15 is a small recreational sailing dinghy, built predominantly of fibreglass. It has a fractional sloop rig, a transom-hung rudder and a centreboard keel.

See also
List of sailing boat types

Similar sailboats
Albacore
Laser 2
Tanzer 14
Tanzer 16

References

Dinghies
1960s sailboat type designs
Sailing yachts
Sailboat type designs by C&C Design
Sailboat types built by CS Yachts